This article is about the particular significance of the year 1992 to Nigeria and its people.

Incumbents

Federal government 
 President: Ibrahim Babangida
 Vice President: Augustus Aikhomu
 Chief of Defence Staff: Sani Abacha
 Chief Justice: Mohammed Bello

Events

July
 4 - parliamentary elections took place, the first since the first since the 1983 military coup
 25 to August, athletes participated in the Barcelona Olympics

September
 26 - 1992 Nigerian Air Force C-130 crash occurs crashes just after take-off from Lagos killing all 158 on board

Unknown
 Wikki Tourists F.C. football club established

Births
 May 12 - Muideen Akanji, boxer
 June 1 - Lateef Elford-Alliyu, footballer
 September 12 – Bernie Ibini-Isei, footballer
 November 1 - Gbenga Arokoyo, footballer 
 November 16 - George Akpabio, footballer
 December 9 - Michael Augustine, footballer
 December 12 - Ramon Azeez, footballer
 December 22 - Mohamed Bachar, footballer
 December 24 - Michel Babatunde footballer
 December 27 - Femi Balogun, footballer

Deaths
 Major-general Abdul Rahman Mamudu, military Governor of Gongola State (born 1937)

References

 
Years of the 20th century in Nigeria